The Harry T. Nicolai House is a house located in northwest Portland, Oregon listed on the National Register of Historic Places.

See also
 National Register of Historic Places listings in Northwest Portland, Oregon

References

Houses on the National Register of Historic Places in Portland, Oregon
Houses completed in 1908
Colonial Revival architecture in Oregon
1908 establishments in Oregon
Hillside, Portland, Oregon